Ulundi Airport  is an airport serving the towns of Ulundi, Nongoma and Melmoth in the Zululand Municipal District of KwaZulu-Natal, South Africa.  Its official name is the Prince Mangosuthu Buthelezi Airport.  The airport is situated 1 km south-west of the entrance to the Ulundi Central Business District at the intersection of the R66 and the P700. The Ulundi airport is in close proximity to the Hluhluwe-iMfolozi Park, and the EMakhosini Ophathe Heritage Park.

Airport facilities 
The airport has a fully staffed and equipped rescue and fire department is on site and is qualified to operate at category 4 – 5 levels. The Airport precinct has extensive terminal facilities, hangar space, land for development, parking for aircraft and automobiles, a fuel depot, hangar space and a fully operational radio navigational approach system.

The Ulundi airport was built as an international gateway to the Zulu kingdom and its 1,750 metre-long main runway can accommodate 737 jet airliners.

Airlines and destinations

See also
 List of airports in South Africa

References 

Airports in South Africa
Buildings and structures in KwaZulu-Natal
Transport in KwaZulu-Natal
Zululand District Municipality